Il Bene e il Male is an Italian television series.

See also
 List of Italian television series

External links
 

Italian television series